Tropes of Transport: Hegel and Emotion is a book 2012 by Katrin Pahl. The book explores and analyzes the literary texts of The Phenomenology of Spirit by Georg Wilhelm Friedrich Hegel.

References

External links 
 

Northwestern University Press books